An active region is a temporary region in the Sun's atmosphere characterized by a strong and complex magnetic field. They are often associated with sunspots and are commonly the source of violent eruptions such as coronal mass ejections and solar flares. The number and location of active regions on the solar disk at any given time is dependent on the solar cycle.

Region numbers
Newly observed active regions on the solar disk are assigned 4-digit region numbers by the Space Weather Prediction Center (SWPC) on the day following the initial observation. The region number assigned to a particular active region is one added to the previously assigned number. For example, the first observation of active region 8090, or AR8090, was followed by AR8091.

According to the SWPC, a number is assigned to a region if it meets at least one of the following criteria:
 It contains a sunspot group of class C or larger based on the Modified Zurich Class sunspot classification system.
 It contains a sunspot group of class A or B confirmed by at least two observers, preferably with observations more than one hour apart.
 It has produced a solar flare with an X-ray burst.
 It contains plage with a white-light brightness of at least 2.5 (on a linear scale 1-5, 5=flare) and has an extent of at least five heliographic degrees.
 It contains plage that is bright near the west limb and is suspected of growing.

The region numbers reached 10,000 in July 2002. However, the SWPC continued using 4-digits, with the inclusion of leading zeros.

Magnetic field

Mount Wilson magnetic classification
The Mount Wilson magnetic classification system, also known as the Hale magnetic classification system, is a method of classifying the magnetic field of active regions. It was first introduced in 1919 by George Ellery Hale and coworkers working at the Mount Wilson Observatory. It originally included only the α, β, and γ magnetic classifications, but it was later modified by H. Künzel in 1965 to include the δ qualifier.

Sunspots

The strong magnetic flux found in active regions is often strong enough to inhibit convection. Without convection transporting energy from the Sun's interior to the photosphere, surface temperature decreases along with the intensity of emitted black body radiation. These areas of cooler plasma are known as sunspots, and often appear in groups. However, not all active regions possess sunspots.

See also
List of solar cycles
List of solar storms
Hyder flare
Magnetic cloud
Orbiting Solar Observatory
Phoebus group, international scientists aiming at detecting solar g modes
Solar and Heliospheric Observatory

References

Solar phenomena
Solar cycles